Deua is a genus of moths in the subfamily Arctiinae. It contains the single species Deua imbutana, which is found on Haiti.

References

Natural History Museum Lepidoptera generic names catalog

Lithosiini